The VR5 engines are a family of petroleum fuelled Internal combustion engines developed by the Volkswagen Group and produced from 1997 to 2006. They are derived from the VR6 engine family, also developed by Volkswagen, but with one less cylinder. The VR5 was the first production block to use five cylinders in a VR design with a 15-degree angle.

Technical Information 
A VR5 engine block consists of two cylinder banks, one bank containing three cylinders and the other containing two. In a transverse layout the three cylinder bank is located towards the front and in a longitudinal layout towards the right. Due to the narrow angle the cylinder arrangement appears like a staggered inline five cylinder. The engines have a firing order of 1-2-4-5-3.

Both versions of the engine had cast aluminium alloy cylinder heads and cast iron cylinder blocks.

AGZ engine

Valvetrain and cylinder head 
The AGZ engine was the first version of the VR5. It had 10 valves in total, with 2 unequal sized valves per cylinder and chain driven camshafts and the AQN/AZX engine had 20 valves in total, with 4 unequal sized valves per cylinder. Due to the use of a single cylinder head, a key design principle of the VR engines, exhaust and intake ports were of unequal length between the two cylinder banks. To mitigate this, Volkswagen used unequally sized valves to ensure even flow and power output from the cylinders.

Engine block and pistons 
The AGZ engine used a cast iron cylinder block with five staggered cylinders. The top of each piston was angled to accommodate for the use of the 15° narrow V angle.

Aspiration, fuel system, and engine management 
The AGZ engine was managed by a Bosch Motronic M3.8.3 engine management system and the AQN/AZX engine by a Bosch Motronic ME7.1 engine management system. The engine used multi-point common rail sequential fuel injection, with fuel injected indirectly into the lower intake manifold section just before the cylinder head intake ports. Fuel and air delivery was controlled by a cable operated throttle body, with a potentiometer monitoring throttle position and allowing the Motronic ECU to deliver the correct amount of fuel. The engine also had a vacuum actuated variable intake manifold, controlled by the ECU via a valve part of the engines vacuum system. The valve is opened and closed depending on engine load, engine speed and throttle position. This allows the engine to take advantage of pressure waves created by the intake valves opening and closing.

The VR5 was used in the Volkswagen Golf, Bora, New Beetle and Passat. The engine was also included in the Toledo, a saloon car made by Volkswagen Group's subsidiary SEAT.

References

Volkswagen Group engines
Piston engine configurations
V5 engines
V engines